Carabus alexandrae is a species of black coloured ground beetle from Carabinae subfamily, that is endemic to Gansu, China.

Subspecies
The species have 3 subspecies all of which could be found in Gansu Province of China:
Carabus alexandrae alexandrae Semenov, 1887
Carabus alexandrae cratocephaloides Semenov, 1887
Carabus alexandrae subidolon Deuve, 1994

References

alexandrae
Beetles described in 1887
Beetles of Asia
Endemic fauna of Gansu
Taxa named by Andrey Semyonov-Tyan-Shansky